BelMal is a private museum located in Belgium, with twin locations in the Durbuy and Manhay municipalities of the province of Luxembourg.

The museum comprises antique travelling trunks and related baggage and travel equipment from around the globe, and the world's most important collection of trunks made by Belgian trunk-makers of the 19th century.

The BelMal Archives include the lists (registries) of the names and brands of trunk makers (malletier) that were active in Europe and around the globe. There is a separate registry of Belgian trunk makers and manufacturers of travel objects.

In the restoration workshop, led by a person of authority in the field of travel trunks restoration and history, travel trunks are restored for the collection and for third parties. In the same workshop new trunks are made to order; some of the specially commissioned ones carry the BelMal Malletier brand name.

Courses in the restoration and in the manufacture of trunks, and in the travel equipment history, are part of the educational activity of the affiliate Ecole des Malletiers (formerly called BelMal Conservatory) tribute to 16th century trunk-makers Nicolas Gilbert of Belgium and Jean Paré of France.

References

 RTBF, in the C'est du Belge broadcast of 18 September 2009 (BelMal collection and restoration special, featured on the occasion of the opening of the new Liège Guillemins railway station).
 The Delvaux 180 Years of Belgian Luxury exhibition held at the MoMu Fashion Museum of Antwerp, Belgium, from 17 September 2009 to 21 February 2010 (BelMal featured in the exhibition book-catalog).
 In Histoire et Passion, a short-movie by Marcel Hellebosch about the BelMal restorer (2009). The movie won the Grand Prize for the Originality of the Subject by the FCVFB, Belgium, in 2010; the Special Grand Prize for the Valorisation of Societal Heritage at Amiens, France, in 2010; and the Prize of the Public at Cognin, France, in 2010.
 Bibliothèque nationale de France (BnF), authority of the person notice FRBNF16523857 (2011), category: restaurateur de malles de voyage.
 In L'Evénement, the Belgian lifestyle magazine, Issue n° 407 (Winter 2011–2012), article on pages 84 and 85.
 In Audi Magazine, Belgium edition of the carmaker's magazine, Issue n° 01/2012, article on pages 62 to 65.
 In Centurion Magazine Online (American Express), caption 'On Refurbished vintage luxury luggage' ('Trunks on show'), 24 August 2012.

External links 

Museums in Luxembourg (Belgium)
Luggage
Fashion museums
Manhay